Retinoic acid-induced protein 3 is a protein that in humans is encoded by the GPRC5A gene. This gene and its encoded mRNA was first identified as a phorbol ester-induced gene, and named Phorbol Ester Induced Gen 1 (PEIG-1); two  years later it was rediscovered as a retinoic acid-inducible gene, and named Retinoic Acid-Inducible Gene 1 (RAIG1).  Its encoded protein was later named Retinoic acid-induced protein 3.

Function 
This gene encodes a member of the type 3 G protein-coupled receptor family, characterized by the signature 7-transmembrane domain motif. The encoded protein may be involved in interaction between retinoic acid and G protein signalling pathways. Retinoic acid plays a critical role in development, cellular growth, and differentiation. This gene may play a role in embryonic development and epithelial cell differentiation.

Post transcriptional regulation 
GPRC5A is one of only a handful of genes known in the literature that are post-transcriptionally controlled by miRNAs through their 5'UTR.

Clinical significance
GPRC5A is dysregulated in many human cancers and in other diseases.

See also 
 Retinoic acid-inducible orphan G protein-coupled receptor

References

Further reading

External links 
 

G protein-coupled receptors